The second government of Alfonso Fernández Mañueco was formed on 20 April 2022, following the latter's election as President of the Junta of Castile and León by the Cortes of Castile and León on 11 April and his scheduled swearing-in on 19 April, as a result of the People's Party (PP) and Vox being able to muster a majority of seats in the Cortes following the 2022 Castilian-Leonese regional election.

The cabinet comprises members of the PP and Vox, to become the first PP–Vox coalition government to be formed as well as the first time a far-right party has entered a government either at the regional or national level in Spain since the country's transition to democracy.

Investiture

Council of Government
The Council of Government is structured into the offices for the president, the vice president, ten ministries and the post of the spokesperson of the Government.

Departmental structure
Alfonso Fernández Mañueco's first government was organised into several superior and governing units, whose number, powers and hierarchical structure varied depending on the ministerial department.

Notes

References

2022 establishments in Castile and León
Cabinets established in 2022
Cabinets of Castile and León